Johnathan Carlos Pereira Souza (born 4 April 1995), or simply Johnathan,  is a Brazilian footballer who plays as a defender for Bulgarian First League club CSKA 1948.

Career
Johnathan is a product of the Goiás youth sportive system. After that, he played for some Brazilian football clubs, until in February 2018 signed a two and half years contract with the Ukrainian Premier League club Stal Kamianske. He joined Bulgarian club Botev Plovdiv in August 2018.

References

External links
Profile at Soccerway
Profile at Zerozero 

1995 births
Living people
Sportspeople from Goiânia
Brazilian footballers
Brazilian expatriate footballers
Goiás Esporte Clube players
Tupi Football Club players
FC Stal Kamianske players
Botev Plovdiv players
FC CSKA 1948 Sofia players
Ukrainian Premier League players
First Professional Football League (Bulgaria) players
Expatriate footballers in Ukraine
Brazilian expatriate sportspeople in Ukraine
Expatriate footballers in Bulgaria
Brazilian expatriate sportspeople in Bulgaria
Association football defenders